Austin High School may refer to

 Austin High School (Alabama), Decatur, Alabama
 Austin High School (Austin, Pennsylvania)
 Austin High School (Indiana), Austin, Indiana
 Austin High School (Minnesota), Austin, Minnesota
 Austin High School (Nevada), formerly known as Lander County High School, listed on the U.S. National Register of Historic Places
 Stephen F. Austin High School (El Paso, Texas), El Paso, Texas
 Stephen F. Austin High School (Fort Bend County, Texas), near
 Stephen F. Austin High School (Houston, Texas), Houston, Texas
 Stephen F. Austin High School (Port Arthur, Texas), Port Arthur, Texas
 Stephen F. Austin High School (Austin, Texas), Austin, Texas
 Austin Catholic High School (Michigan), Ray Township, Michigan
 Austin Catholic Preparatory School, Detroit, Michigan
 Austin Community Academy High School, Chicago, Illinois
 Austin Preparatory School, Reading, Massachusetts
 Austin High School, a school for African Americans that merged to form Austin-East High School in Knoxville, Tennessee

Associated groups 
 Austin High School Gang, a group of musicians who attended an Austin High School in Chicago.